Fantômas is a fictional character created by French writers Marcel Allain and Pierre Souvestre. 

Fantômas may also refer to:

 Fantômas (1913 serial), directed by Louis Feuillade
 Fantômas (1920 serial), directed by Edward Sedgwick
 Fantômas (1932 film), directed by Pál Fejös 
 Fantômas (1946 film), a 1946 French crime film
 Fantômas (1964 film), a French film
 Fantômas (band), avant-garde metal supergroup
 Fantômas (Fantômas album), 1999
 Fantômas (Amiina album), 2016

See also
 Fantomex, a Marvel Comics superhero